Roland Michel Tremblay (born October 15, 1972 in Quebec City, Quebec) is a French Canadian author, poet, scriptwriter, development producer and science-fiction consultant. He has been living in London since 1995.

Biography 
Roland Michel Tremblay was born in Quebec City but moved to the Saguenay-Lac-Saint-Jean region in the North of the Quebec province when he was 7 years old. He obtained a college diploma in Sciences from the CEGEP de Jonquière in 1991, and a B.A. in French Literature and Philosophy from the University of Ottawa in Ontario in 1994. He studied one year at La Sorbonne in Paris and finished his master's degree in French Literature at Birkbeck, University of London in 1999.

He has been writing since he was 10 years old, and lived in Canada, France, Belgium, the United States and the United Kingdom. He is now an author and technical adviser, writing novels, essays, poetry, television and film scripts. He has six books published in French in Paris by iDLivre and GT Publishers, and his books are distributed in many French-speaking countries.

Tremblay has written poetry, novels and film scripts mostly in English. He developed a science fiction website aimed at helping authors working in the genre for television. He lived in Los Angeles during 2005 and 2006, but then returned to live in Isleworth, West London.

Roland Michel Tremblay is not related to Michel Tremblay, one of the most celebrated authors in Quebec. He is openly gay.

Bibliography 
Published literary work in French
 Eclecticism (philosophical essay), 
 Waiting for Paris (novel), 
 Denfert-Rochereau (novel), 
 The Anarchist (poetry), 
 A French-Canadian in Paris (journal/essay), 
 A French-Canadian in New York (journal/essay), 

Produced work in television (development producer/science consultant) (uncredited)
 Strange Days at Blake Holsey High (Black Hole High, 2002) (NBC and Discovery Channel Television Series)
 E=mc², The World's Most Famous Equation (WGBH/PBS, Channel 4 UK and Arte Documentary, 2003)

References

External links 
 The Crowned Anarchist Sci-Fi and Literature 
 The Marginal
 L'Anarchiste Couronné Littérature (French)
 Le Marginal (French)
 TG Publisher  (French)

1972 births
Alumni of Birkbeck, University of London
21st-century Canadian dramatists and playwrights
21st-century Canadian novelists
21st-century Canadian poets
Canadian dramatists and playwrights in French
Canadian screenwriters in French
Canadian male novelists
Canadian novelists in French
Canadian science fiction writers
Canadian poets in French
French Quebecers
Canadian gay writers
Canadian LGBT dramatists and playwrights
Canadian LGBT poets
Living people
University of Ottawa alumni
Writers from Quebec City
Canadian male screenwriters
Canadian male poets
Canadian male dramatists and playwrights
21st-century Canadian male writers
21st-century Canadian screenwriters
Gay poets
Gay screenwriters
Gay dramatists and playwrights
21st-century Canadian LGBT people